The  is an electric multiple unit (EMU) train type operated by the private railway operator Chichibu Railway on Chichibu Main Line local services in Japan.

Fleet details
, three three-car sets (sets 5001 to 5003) were in service.

The DeHa 5000 and 5100 cars are each fitted with one lozenge-type pantograph.

History
Four 3-car trains were converted in 1999 from former Toei 6000 series (Toei Mita Line) commuter EMUs.

References

Electric multiple units of Japan
Train-related introductions in 1999
Chichibu Railway
1500 V DC multiple units of Japan
Kawasaki multiple units
Kinki Sharyo multiple units
Alna Koki rolling stock
Hitachi multiple units